This is a list of animated television series produced in Pakistan.

Series 
This is a list of Pakistani animated pictures.

See also 
 List of Pakistani animated films

References 

Pakistani
Animated television series